Skyline Drive is a 105-mile (169 km) road that runs the entire length of the Shenandoah National Park in the Blue Ridge Mountains of Virginia, United States.

Skyline Drive may also refer to:

 Skyline Drive (Colorado), in Cañon City, Colorado
 Skyline Drive (New Jersey), in the Ramapo Mountains between Ringwood in Passaic County, New Jersey and Oakland in Bergen County, New Jersey
 Skyline Drive, part of Texas Park Road 3, in Davis Mountains State Park
 "Skyline Drive" (song), a song by the Cherry Poppin' Daddies from the 1994 album Rapid City Muscle Car

See also
 Mount Equinox Skyline Drive, Manchester, Vermont
 Skyline Boulevard, follows the ridge of the Santa Cruz Mountains on the San Francisco Peninsula in California
 Skyline Parkway, a scenic byway in Duluth, Minnesota